The throne of God is the reigning centre of God in the Abrahamic religions: primarily Judaism, Christianity, and Islam. The throne is said by various holy books to reside beyond the Seventh Heaven which is called Araboth ( ‘ărāḇōṯ) in Judaism. Many in the Christian religion consider the ceremonial chair as symbolizing or representing an allegory of the holy Throne of God.

Judaism
Micaiah (1 Kings 22:19), Isaiah (Isaiah 6), Ezekiel (Ezekiel 1) and Daniel (Daniel 7:9) all speak of God's throne, although some philosophers, such as Saʿadiah Gaon and Maimonides, interpreted such mention of a "throne" as allegory.

The heavenly throne room or throne room of God is a more detailed presentation of the throne, into the representation of throne room or divine court.

Micaiah's throneroom vision
Micaiah's extended prophecy (1 Kings 22:19) is the first detailed depiction of a heavenly throne room in Judaism.

Zechariah's throneroom vision
Zechariah 3 depicts a vision of the heavenly throne room where Satan and the Angel of the Lord contend over Joshua the High Priest in the time of his grandson Eliashib the High Priest. Many Christians consider this a literal event, others such as Goulder (1998) view the vision as symbolic of crisis on earth, such as opposition from Sanballat the Horonite.

Isaiah
In Isaiah 6, Isaiah sees the Lord sitting upon a throne, high and lifted up, and his train (robe) filled the temple. Above the throne stood the Seraphims (angelic beings), and each one had 6 wings. With two wings they covered their faces, with two they covered their feet, and with two they flew. And the Seraphim were calling out to one another, "Holy, Holy, Holy, is the Lord of Hosts" (Some translations title it, 'Lord of heavens armies', or 'Lord Almighty'). Their voices shook the temple to its foundations, and the entire building was filled with smoke.

Wisdom of Solomon
In the apocryphal Book of Wisdom, the prayer offered by Solomon asking God for wisdom calls for her to be "sent from the throne of your glory".

Dead Sea Scrolls
The concept of a heavenly throne occurs in three Dead Sea Scroll texts. Later speculation on the throne of God became a theme of Merkabah mysticism.

Christianity

In the New Testament, the Throne of God is talked about in several forms, including Heaven as the Throne of God, the Throne of David, the Throne of Glory, the Throne of Grace and many more. The New Testament continues Jewish identification of heaven itself as the "throne of God", but also locates the throne of God as "in heaven" and having a secondary seat at the right hand of God for the Session of Christ.

Revelation
The Book of Revelation describes the Seven Spirits of God which surround the throne, and its author wishes his readers in the Seven Asian churches to be blessed with grace from God, from the seven who are before God's throne, and from Jesus Christ in Heaven. He states that in front of the throne there appears to be "a sea of glass, clear as crystal", and that the throne is surrounded by a lion, an ox, a man, and a flying eagle; each with six wings and covered with eyes, who constantly cry "Holy, holy, holy is the Lord God Almighty, who was, and is, and is to come" repeatedly. It is also said that "out of the throne proceeded lightnings and thunderings and voices".

Islam

 Abu Mansur al-Baghdadi (d. 429/1037) in his al-Farq bayn al-Firaq (The Difference between the Sects) reports that 'Ali ibn Abi Talib, said: "God created the Throne as an indication of His power, not for taking it as a place for Himself." The vast majority of Islamic scholars, including Sunnis (Ash'aris, Maturidis and Sufis), Mu'tazilis, and Shi'is (Twelvers and Isma'ilis) believe  the Throne ( al-'Arsh) as a symbol of God's power and authority and not as a dwelling place for Himself, while some Islamic sects, such as the Karramis and the Salafis/Wahhabis believe that God has created it as a place of dwelling. According to the British academic, Islam Issa,  in Islamic theology, it is the largest of creations.

The Quran mentions the throne some 25 times (33 times as Al-'Arsh), such as in verse Q10:3 and Q23:116:

The Quran depicts the angels as carrying the throne of God and praising his glory, similar to Old Testament images.

The Ayat al-Kursi (often glossed as "Verse of the footstool"), is a verse from Al-Baqara, the second sura of the Quran, and is regarded as the book's greatest verse. It references the Kursi (كرسي) which is different from the Throne [عرش], and also God's greatest name, Al-Hayy Al-Qayyoom ("The Living, the Eternal"). Scholars of hadith have stated that Muhammad said the reward for reciting this verse after every prayer is Paradise, and that reciting it is a protection from the devil.

Prophetic hadith also establish that The Throne is above the roof of Al-Firdaus Al-'Ala, the highest level of Paradise where God's closest and most beloved servants in the hereafter shall dwell.

See also 
 Ayatul Kursi
 Hlidskjalf (throne of Odin)
 Kolob
 Origins and architecture of the Taj Mahal (section Concepts, symbolism and interpretations)
 Shesha – similar concept in Hinduism

Bibliography
Notes

References

 - Total pages: 340 
 - Total pages: 702 
 - Total pages: 1116 

 - Total pages: 280

External links

Heaven
Heaven in Christianity
Christian theology
Islamic theology
Jewish theology 
Biblical phrases
Religious terminology
Thrones
Theophanies in the Hebrew Bible